Juan Hernandez Navarrete (born 24 February 1987) is a Mexican professional boxer who held the WBC flyweight title in 2017.

Professional career

Hernández turned professional in 2004 and compiled a record of 18-1 before unsuccessfully challenging Japanese fighter Kazuto Ioka for his WBC minimumweight title. Hernández would get a second title opportunity, this time in the flyweight division for the newly vacated WBC title. He would travel to Thailand to take on and beat local fighter Nawaphon Kaikanha to be crowned champion.

Professional boxing record

See also
List of flyweight boxing champions
List of Mexican boxing world champions

References

External links

1987 births
Living people
Mini-flyweight boxers
Flyweight boxers
World flyweight boxing champions
World Boxing Council champions
Sportspeople from Morelia
Boxers from Michoacán
Mexican male boxers